Pasrur (Punjabi and ), is a city of Sialkot District  in the Punjab province of Pakistan. The city is the capital of Pasrur Tehsil and is administratively subdivided into 26 wards of municipal committee Pasrur.

It is located at 32°16'0N 74°40'0E with an altitude of 238 metres (784 feet). 

Nearby are the remains of a bridge built by Shah Daula.

British era
During British rule, Pasrur became the headquarters of Pasrur Tehsil. The town (which lies 18 miles south of the district capital Sialkot) lies on the Sialkot to Amritsar road. The population in 1901 was 8,335. The trade of Pasrur has become very decayed, partly through the opening of the North-Western Railway and partly on account of the octroi duties which have diverted trade to the neighboring village of Saukin Wind. Hand-printed cotton stuffs were the only manufacture of importance.

The municipality was created in 1867. The income during the ten years ending 1902-3 averaged Rs. 7,900, and the expenditure Rs. 7,800. The income in 1903-4 was Rs. 8,000, chiefly from octroi ; and the expenditure was Rs. 6,900. The town had an Anglo-vernacular high school maintained by the District board, and a Government dispensary.

References

Cities and towns in Sialkot District